Jõgeva County ( or Jõgevamaa) is one of 15 counties of Estonia. It is situated in eastern part of the country and borders Ida-Viru County to the north-east, Lake Peipus to the east, Tartu County to the south, Viljandi County to the south-west, Järva County to the north-west and Lääne-Viru County to the north.

History 
Jõgeva County or Jõgevamaa was created January 1, 1990 from a parts of Viljandimaa and Tartumaa counties.

County government 
The County government (Estonian: Maavalitsus) was led by a governor (Estonian: maavanem), who was appointed by the Government of Estonia for a term of five years. Since 2009 until 2018, the Jõgeva County governor position was held by Viktor Svjatõšev. From 01.01.2018 County governments were shut down in Estonia.

Municipalities 

The county is subdivided into municipalities. There are three rural municipalities (Estonian: vallad – parishes) in Jõgeva County.

Religion

See also
Vooremaa
Vooremaa (newspaper)

Images

References

External links 

Jõgeva County – Official website (in Estonian)

 
Counties of Estonia